The Berlin Thunder were a professional American football team in NFL Europe.

History
The Thunder came into existence as an expansion team, after the London/England Monarchs franchise shut down operations, prior to the 1999 season. Home games from 1999 to 2002 were played at Friedrich-Ludwig-Jahn-Sportpark and one game in 2006. Olympiastadion was the home stadium from 2003 to 2007. They were the second team in league history to use the Thunder name, following the Orlando Thunder from 1991 to 1992.

The Thunder won the World Bowl 3 times: 2001, 2002 and 2004 (a year that they went 9–1). They also made it to the World Bowl in 2005 but were defeated by the Amsterdam Admirals 21–27.

Two Berlin quarterbacks, Rohan Davey (2004) and Dave Ragone (2005), were named NFL Europe Offensive Most Valuable Players. Linebacker Rich Scanlon (2005) was named NFL Europe Defensive MVP. In 2006, the Thunder had three players earn All-NFL Europe honors: guard Chad Beasley and safety Anthony Floyd earned all-league honors at their respective positions and German defensive end Christian Mohr was honored as the national player on the defensive all-league team.

On 1 April 2006, the Thunder recorded their first tie in franchise history. Trailing the Hamburg Sea Devils 17–0 at halftime, the Thunder erased their deficit to tie it up, going into overtime in which neither team could come up with a point. This was only the second tie in the history of NFL Europe. The previous tie came in the 1992 season between the Birmingham Fire and the London Monarchs, also 17-17.

An unrelated team of the same name is to play in the inaugural 2021 season of the new European League of Football

Season-by-season

Head coaches

Notable players

  Richard Adjei – LB (2007)
    David Akers – K (1999)
    Chris Barclay – RB (2007)
    Lang Campbell – QB (2005)
    Travis Lulay – QB (2007)
    Rohan Davey – QB (2004)
    Anthony Floyd – S (2005)
    Chas Gessner – S (2004)
    Ben Hamilton – C (2002)
    Tim Hasselbeck – QB (2002)
    Madre Hill – RB (2001)
    Israel Idonije – DE (2004)
    Dave Ragone – QB (2005)
    Brian Simnjanovski – P/K (2005)
    Brian Waters – C/OG (2000)
    Phil Stambaugh – QB (2003)
    Ahmad Hawkins – CB (2002)
    Tony Pape – G (2005)

References

 
Defunct American football teams in Germany
NFL Europe (WLAF) teams
Sport in Berlin
American football teams established in 1999
American football teams disestablished in 2007
1999 establishments in Germany
2007 disestablishments in Germany